The 1949–50 Scottish Districts season is a record of all the rugby union matches for Scotland's district teams.

History

Edinburgh District beat Glasgow District in the Inter-City match.

Results

Inter-City

Glasgow District:

Edinburgh District:

Other Scottish matches

Midlands District:

North of Scotland District: 

Rest of the West:

Glasgow District: 

North of Scotland District:

South of Scotland District:

Junior matches

Edinburgh District:

South of Scotland District: 

West of Scotland District:

East of Scotland District:

Trial matches

Blues Trial:

Whites Trial: 

Probables:

Possibles:

English matches

Northumberland:

Edinburgh District: 

South of Scotland District:

Cumberland and Westmorland:

International matches

No touring matches this season.

References

1949–50 in Scottish rugby union
Scottish Districts seasons